Quinten Louis Lawrence (born September 21, 1984) is a former gridiron football defensive back. He was drafted by the Kansas City Chiefs in the sixth round of the 2009 NFL Draft. He played college football at McNeese State.

Early years
Lawrence attended Carencro High School in Carencro, Louisiana and was a student and a letterman in football, basketball, and track & field. In football, as a senior, he had 698 receiving yards and thirteen receiving touchdowns, and after the season, he was named as an All-District, All-Parish, and All-Acadiana selection. In basketball, he was an All-Parish selection. In track & field, he was a high jump state champion. Quinten Lawrence graduated from Carencro High School in 2004.
His parents are Wiltion and Laynnette Lawrence.

Toronto Argonauts

Lawrence was signed by the Toronto Argonauts on June 6, 2013.

External links
 Toronto Argonauts bio
 McNeese State Cowboys bio

1984 births
Living people
People from Carencro, Louisiana
Players of American football from Louisiana
American football wide receivers
American football return specialists
McNeese Cowboys football players
Kansas City Chiefs players